Timmy Big Hands was a humor webzine created in 2000 by the former cast and crew of Mystery Science Theater 3000, including Michael J. Nelson, Bill Corbett, and Kevin Murphy. The site garnered much critical acclaim and accolades, but was eventually retired the following year. The site featured odd but humorous reviews of everyday items, comics, strange games, and new syrup ads each week.

In 2001, the site was put up for sale on eBay. The new owners decided not to continue with the project. In an interview in 2003, Nelson stated

Content
Games included such oddities as "Kill-a-Guy" where the player is God, and a simple click on a man kills him, as well as an interactive game called "Apologize to Steve", in which the concept was to apologize to Steve.

Comics included "The Cliparts" which were simply crafted from clip art and given dialogue balloons. The stories were usually nonsensical and the art would run the gamut from office workers to suddenly having a tall Indian enter the frame.

Contributors
 Michael J. Nelson
 Kevin Murphy
 Bill Corbett
 Patrick Brantseg
 Paul Chaplin

References

External links
 

American comedy websites
Mystery Science Theater 3000
Defunct American websites
Internet properties established in 2000